Don Dixon (born 1951) is an American astronomical artist practicing space art in the tradition of Chesley Bonestell.

Born in Easton, Pennsylvania,  Dixon has created cover art for Scientific American, Sky and Telescope, Omni, The Magazine of Fantasy & Science Fiction, Astronomy Magazine, and many other publications. Dixon's paintings have been used to illustrate the covers of several science fiction books, such as the Mars Trilogy by Kim Stanley Robinson and the Galactic Center Saga by Gregory Benford. He directed and co-wrote the immersive animated film Centered in the Universe, which premiered in 2006 at the Samuel Oschin Planetarium at Griffith Observatory, where he served as Art Director from 1991-2021. He is a founding member of the International Association of Astronomical Artists (IAAA) and was elected a Fellow of that organization in 2000.

See also
List of space artists

References 
"NASA Does it Better:Space Artists Face Reality" by Jia-Rui Chong, Los Angeles Times, June 18, 2006
"Visions of Space" David A. Hardy Paper Tiger 1989
"Space Art" Ron Miller Starlog Magazine
"Universe" Don Dixon Houghton Mifflin 1981

External links 

Putting the Universe on Canvas, Interview on Planetary Radio (July 24, 2006)
The SF Site: A Conversation with Don Dixon
History of the IAAA

1951 births
Living people
20th-century American male artists
20th-century American painters
21st-century American painters
21st-century American male artists
American male painters
American people of Italian descent
American speculative fiction artists
Painters from California
People from Easton, Pennsylvania
Role-playing game artists
Science fiction artists
Space artists